Emmalocera rotundipennis is a species of snout moth in the genus Emmalocera. It was described by Joseph de Joannis in 1930 and is known from Vietnam.

References

Moths described in 1930
Emmalocera